Alterscape is a 2018 science fiction horror film written and directed by the American actor and filmmaker Serge Levin. The film stars Michael Ironside, Charles Baker and Alex Veadov, produced by Jon Keeyes and Matthew Panepinto.

Alterscape had its world premiere at the Philip K. Dick Science Fiction Film Festival on February 23, 2018 in New York, where the film won the Philip K. Dick Best Feature award. Alterscape was produced by Isle Empire Pictures, a subsidiary of Isle Empire Holding.

Synopsis 

After a suicide attempt, Sam Miller (Charles Baker), coping with loss and depression, submits to a series of trials that fine-tune human emotions, but his unique reaction to the tests send him on a journey that transcends both physical and perceived reality. Under the supervision of Doctor Julian Loro (Michael Ironside), Sam undergoes a series of experiments to scan and alter human emotions.

Cast 
 Michael Ironside as Doctor Julian Loro
 Charles Baker as Sam Miller
 Alex Veadov as Doctor Kaine Egres
 Serge Levin as Ray Miller
 Todd Lewis as Edward Irving
 Debbie Rochon as Nurse Jane Toppan
 Alex Lane as Cruz
 Mack Kuhr as Devino
 Olan Montgomery as The Controller & Trucker
 Antonio D. Charity as Gills
 Tim Duquette as Dr. Elsi Nivel

References

External links  
 

2010s science fiction horror films
2018 films
2018 horror films
2018 science fiction films
American science fiction horror films
Films about science
2010s English-language films
2010s American films